Westside Xtreme Wrestling (wXw) is a professional wrestling promotion based in Essen, Germany. wXw has been one of the leading professional wrestling promotions in Germany, and most of its events have been held in the Ruhr district, primarily in Oberhausen. Since 2013, wXw regularly tours through Germany, adding tour stops outside the country including Switzerland, the Czech Republic and the United Kingdom.

This is a list of professional wrestlers who currently work for Westside Xtreme Wrestling, as well as a list of alumni. Executive officers, referees and ring announcers are also listed.

The guest wrestlers appeared due to wXw developing working relationships with several American promotions including Chikara, Pro Wrestling Guerrilla, Beyond Wrestling, Combat Zone Wrestling (CZW) and Evolve and several Japanese promotions including Dragon Gate, Pro Wrestling Noah, Dramatic Dream Team and Big Japan Pro Wrestling. Through the working relationship with wXw, Big Japan's World Strong Heavyweight Championship features both the CZW and wXw logos. wXw has also maintained relationship withs several European-based promotions, including British promotions International Pro Wrestling: United Kingdom, Preston City Wrestling, All Star Wrestling, and Progress Wrestling.

Roster

Active

{| class="wikitable sortable" align="left center" 
|-
!width:15%;"|Ring name
!width:15%;"|Real name
!width:25%;"|Notes
|-
|Ahura
|Achmed Wittkamp
|
|-
|Aigle Blanc
|Cyril Coquerelle
|
|-
|Aliss Ink
|
|
|-
|Amale
|Amale Dib
|
|-
|Anil Marik
|Anil Yilmaz
|
|-
|Ava Everett
|Evie Rodgerson
|
|-
|Axel "Axeman" Tischer
|Axel Tischer
|Freelancer
|-
|Aytac
|Aytac Arsian
|
|-
|Baby Allison
|Laura Fischer
|wXw Women's Champion
|-
|Bobby Gunns
|Robert Schild
|
|-
|Calypso
|Calypso Brunel
|
|-
|Danny Fray
|
|
|-
|Dennis "Cash" Dullnig
|Dennis Dullnih
|
|-
|Dover
|Istvan Szalay
|wXw World Tag Team Champion
|-
|Elijah Blum
|
|
|-
|Fast Time Moodo
|
|
|-
|Gulyas Junior
|Attila Boros
|
|-
|Heisenberg
|Fabian Neitzel
|
|-
|Hektor
|Christian Tscherpel
|
|-
|Icarus
|Aron Kiss
|wXw World Tag Team Champion
|-
|Iva Kolasky
|Emese Kolarovszki
|
|-
|Jacob Crane
|
|
|-
|Jurn Simmons
|Jurn Sijtzema
|
|-
|Laurance Roman
|
|wXw Shotgun Champion
|-
|Levaniel
|Niklas Knoche
|
|-
|Maggot
|Amir Wittkamp
|
|-
|Maria De La Rosa
|
|
|-
|Massimo Pesca
|
|
|-
|Metehan
|Metehan Kocabaşoğlu
|
|-
|Michael Knight
|Michael Klug
|
|-
|Michael Schenkenberg
|Michael Horst
|
|-
|Michelle Green
|
|
|-
|Mike D Vecchio
|Michael Vecchio
|
|-
|Nick Schreier
|Jannik Schreier
|
|-
|Nikita Charisma
|
|
|-
|Norman Harras
|Norman Halberschmidt
|Director of Sports
|-
|Peter Tihanyi
|
|
|-
|Rambo
|Rambo Braun
|
|-
|Robert Dreissker
|Robert Dreissker
|Coach
|-
|Senza Volto
|Vincent Fenech
|
|-
|Shigehiro Irie
|Shigehiro Irie
|wXw Unified World Wrestling Champion
|-
|Stephanie Maze
|
|
|-
|The Rotation
|Axel Halbach
|Coach
|-
|Tristan Archer
|Clement Petiot
|
|-
|Zafar Ameen
|
|

Alumni

Tag teams & factions
{| class="wikitable sortable" align="left center" 
|-
!width:15%;"|Name
!width:15%;"|Members
|-
|Amboss
|Dover, Icarus, Laurance Roman and Robert Dreissker
|-
|Arrows of Hungary
|Dover and Icarus
|-
|OnlyFriends
|Bobby Gunns and Michael Knight
|-
|Pretty Bastards
|Ahura and Maggot
|-
|Rott & Flott
|Nikita Charisma and Michael Schenkenberg
|-
|The Frenchadors
|Aigle Blanc and Senza Volto
|-

Other staff

Notable guests

Abdullah Kobayashi
A-Kid
Alex Colon
Allysin Kay
Alpha Female
Anthony Greene
A. R. Fox
Brahman Kei
Brahman Shu
Cima
Chris Dickinson
Chris Ridgeway
Dave Crist
Dave Mastiff
Dave McCall
Davey Boy Smith Jr.
Davey Richards
David Starr
Dezmond Xavier
D. J. Hyde
Drake Younger
Drew Gulak
El Lindaman
Hiroshi Tanahashi
Isami Kodaka
Jake Crist
Jaki Numazawa
Jimmy Havoc
Joey Janela
John Silver
Jordan Oliver
Jushin Thunder Liger
Kankuro Hoshino
Kazuki Hashimoto
KC Navarro
Keith Lee
Killer Kelly
Kimber Lee
Leyla Hirsch
Lionheart
Lio Rush
LuFisto
Madman Pondo
Masada
Masashi Takeda
Masato Inaba
Matt Striker
Matt Tremont
Men's Teioh
Mike Bailey
Nate Carter
Oney Lorcan
Paul London
Rhyno
Rich Swann
Ricochet
Ryuji Ito
Sha Samuels
Shadow WX
Shane Strickland
Shigehiro Irie
Shinobu
Shinya Ishikawa
T-Hawk
Takumi Tsukamoto
Toni Storm
Tracy Williams
Trent?
Trent Seven
Tyler Bate
Yoshihito Sasaki
Yuki Ishikawa
Yuko Miyamoto
Yuji Okabayashi
Zachary Wentz

See also

 List of professional wrestling promotions in Europe

References

External links 
  
 wxwNOW (German wrestling network)

Lists of professional wrestling personnel
Westside Xtreme Wrestling